Frantz Jørgensen (3 August 1881 – 17 January 1973) was a Danish fencer. He competed in the individual épée event at the 1908 Summer Olympics.

References

1881 births
1973 deaths
Danish male fencers
Olympic fencers of Denmark
Fencers at the 1908 Summer Olympics
Sportspeople from Copenhagen